Mary Helena Zachos (March 5, 1856 – February 28, 1951) was an American college professor and elocutionist, who was on the faculty at Cooper Union from 1897 to 1939.

Early life
Mary Helena Zachos was born in Dayton, Ohio, the daughter of John Celivergos Zachos and Harriet Tompkins Canfield Zachos. Her father was born in Constantinople of Greek parents, and brought to the United States by American educational reformer Samuel Gridley Howe. The elder Dr. Zachos also taught oratory at Cooper Union. 

Helena Zachos attended Wells College, graduating in 1875; she pursued further training at the American Academy of Dramatic Arts.

Career
Helena Zachos taught English, oratory, debate, parliamentary procedure, and elocution classes at Cooper Union beginning in 1897, with very popular classes in the school's extension catalog. She was the coach of the school's debating teams, and advised student commencement speakers until 1939. For some of her tenure at Cooper Union, she also taught "expression" at the Friends Seminary in New York. Zachos also wrote one-act plays, poems, and pieces for recitation. Her own performances as a dramatic reader were admired for their "penetration and magnetism".

She was president of the Wells College Club of New York, and a trustee of the Library Lecture Association. She also served on the executive board of the National Association of Elocutionists.

Personal life
Zachos died in 1951, just before her 95th birthday, in New York City.

Wells College awards the  M. Helena Zachos 1875 Prize for excellence in prose composition.

References

Cooper Union faculty
Wells College alumni
American people of Greek descent
People from Dayton, Ohio
1856 births
1951 deaths
Elocutionists
20th-century Greek Americans
19th-century Greek Americans